Cucumber soup is a traditional Polish and Lithuanian soup (Polish: ( sometimes simply ogórkowa). It is  made from sour, salted cucumbers and potato. Occasionally rice is substituted for the potatoes.

Cucumber soup is also any soup using cucumbers as a primary ingredient, and is present in various cuisines. The two major varieties are fresh cucumber soup and pickled cucumber soup.

A similar soup is also common in Russia and Ukraine, where it is known as rassolnik. There is another cucumber based soup known as tarator in Bulgaria, which is served cold.

Fresh cucumber soups
Some fresh cucumber soups are just a blend of ingredients (cucumber, spices, other vegetables or fruits, etc.) served cold, others are cooked, possibly in some kind of broth, and served either hot or chilled.

See also

 
 
 
 
 mizeria, fresh cucumber salad

References

Further reading
 

Cold soups
Polish soups
Slavic cuisine
Vegetable soups
Soup